Two major blizzards occurred in the year 1888.

The Great Blizzard of 1888 which struck parts of the eastern United States and Atlantic Canada from March 11 to March 14
The so-called Schoolhouse Blizzard which affected the northern Great Plains on January 12